The 1972 United States presidential election in Massachusetts took place on November 7, 1972, as part of the 1972 United States presidential election, which was held throughout all 50 states and D.C. Voters chose 14 representatives, or electors to the Electoral College, who voted for president and vice president.

Massachusetts voted for the Democratic nominee, Senator George McGovern of South Dakota, over incumbent Republican President Richard Nixon of California. McGovern's running mate was U.S. Ambassador Sargent Shriver of Maryland, who had replaced Senator Thomas Eagleton during the campaign, while Nixon ran with incumbent Vice President Spiro Agnew of Maryland.

McGovern carried Massachusetts with 54.20% of the vote to Nixon's 45.23%, a Democratic victory margin of 8.97%. In the midst of a massive nationwide Republican landslide in which Richard Nixon had carried 49 states, Massachusetts proved to be the only state in the nation that would cast its electoral votes for George McGovern, joined by the District of Columbia. McGovern also carried the state by a surprisingly comfortable nine-point margin, making the state 32% more Democratic than the national average in the 1972 election.

McGovern, a staunch liberal Democrat best known for his strong principled opposition to the Vietnam War, was painted by the Nixon campaign as an extremist too far to the left of the American mainstream at the time, and this paid off in delivering Nixon a nationwide re-election landslide. Prior to 1972, Massachusetts had been a Democratic-leaning state since 1928, and a Democratic stronghold since 1960. But McGovern's comfortable victory in 1972 still stands out, as many other traditional Democratic strongholds abandoned the Democrats in 1972. For example, Nixon took neighboring Rhode Island by six points, even though it normally voted similarly to Massachusetts. J. Anthony Lukas noted that many New Yorkers felt that Ted Kennedy's outsize money and influence in Massachusetts played a major role in keeping the state in the Democratic column, summing up this explanation simply as "Teddy did it". Kennedy was also the brother-in-law of Democratic vice presidential nominee Shriver.

On the county map, McGovern carried 9 of the state's 14 counties, including the most heavily populated parts of the state. The state's capital and largest city, Boston, would prove to be a McGovern stronghold; voters in Suffolk County, where Boston is located, cast 66% of the vote for McGovern. Boston is one of the few areas in the country where McGovern actually outperformed Jimmy Carter’s performance four years later in 1976; while Carter won narrow popular and electoral victories nationally, he carried Suffolk County with only 61%. On the other hand, despite Nixon's loss in the state and though Ronald Reagan would carry the state twice, this election remains the last time Dukes County, which had never voted Democratic before Lyndon B. Johnson’s landslide in 1964, has voted Republican. It is also the last time that the towns of Deerfield, Gill, Monterey, Oak Bluffs, Pelham, Tisbury, Williamsburg, and Williamstown have voted Republican.

The results in 1972 made Massachusetts the only state which Richard Nixon never carried in any of his three presidential campaigns. It voted for its native son John F. Kennedy when he defeated Nixon in 1960, and Hubert Humphrey when he lost to Nixon in 1968. This was also the first time in history that an incumbent Republican president won reelection without carrying Massachusetts, a feat that has only been repeated once more, in 2004.

Results

Results by county

Results by Congressional district
McGovern won 10 of 12 Congressional districts, including three that elected Republicans. Nixon won 2 that both elected Democrats.

Results by municipality

"Don't blame me! I'm from Massachusetts"

After Nixon was re-elected, he would later resign only a year and a half into his second term due to his involvement in the Watergate scandal and the illegal activities he committed. After the Watergate scandal broke and Nixon resigned due to criminal activity, a bumper sticker with the words "Don't blame me! I'm from Massachusetts" became a symbol of the sentiment felt by Massachusetts residents, serving as a proverbial "I told you so" to the 49 states that supported Nixon's re-election.

See also
 1972 United States presidential election in the District of Columbia, the only other place that voted Democratic in the 1972 presidential election.
 1984 United States presidential election in Minnesota, the only state to vote Democratic in 1984, like Massachusetts was in 1972.
 United States presidential elections in Massachusetts

References

1972
1972 Massachusetts elections
Massachusetts